The Church of San Andrés (Spanish: Iglesia de San Andrés) is a church located in Elciego, Spain. It was declared Bien de Interés Cultural in 1984.

References 

Churches in Álava
Bien de Interés Cultural landmarks in Álava